Marco Khaleel Zamboni (born 7 December 1977) is an Italian professional football defender, currently playing for AC Garda.

Club career
Zamboni was born in Bussolengo, Italy. After starting his career with Chievo in 1995, he played for Juventus between 1997 and 1999, but immediately after he was signed by the Turin club in the summer of 1997, he was loaned to Napoli of Serie A in October and subsequently back to Chievo (Serie B) in January.

After he was loaned to U.S. Lecce, he was spotted by Serie A team Udinese Calcio. He was signed in co-ownership deal for €1.29M (2.5 billion lire) .Udinese also signed Morgan De Sanctis in co-ownership deal also for €1.29M (2.5 billion lire).

After not playing in 2001–02 season, he left on loan again to Modena F.C. of Serie A, then Verona (Serie B). In summer 2003, he was signed by Napoli again, then time played 37 games in Serie B. In summer 2004, he returned to Serie A football, for Reggina Calcio. He then spotted by U.C. Sampdoria, signed him on loan.

Ahead of the 2019–20 season, 41-year old Zamboni joined AC Garda.

International career
Zamboni has been capped for Italy national under-21 football team. He was an unused member of the Italy squad that won the gold medal at the 1997 Mediterranean Games Football Tournament, on home soil.

Style of play
Zamboni is a reliable defender who possesses great physical strength, although he is not particularly skilful from a technical standpoint; his characteristics led him to be compared to Pietro Vierchowod in his youth. He is capable of playing both as a centre-back and as a right-back.

Honours
Udinese
UEFA Intertoto Cup: 2000

References

External links

National Team stats. 

Living people
1977 births
Sportspeople from the Province of Verona
Association football defenders
Italian footballers
Italy under-21 international footballers
A.C. ChievoVerona players
Juventus F.C. players
S.S.C. Napoli players
U.S. Lecce players
Udinese Calcio players
Modena F.C. players
Hellas Verona F.C. players
Reggina 1914 players
U.C. Sampdoria players
Spezia Calcio players
F.C. Crotone players
S.P.A.L. players
A.C. Trento 1921 players
Serie A players
Serie B players
Serie C players
Serie D players
Mediterranean Games gold medalists for Italy
Mediterranean Games medalists in football
Competitors at the 1997 Mediterranean Games
Footballers from Veneto